Luca Luciano (born 12 August 1975 in Naples, Italy) is a solo artist and a thinker, renowned as a clarinet virtuoso and a composer and much appreciated for his interest in philosophy, who has lived in the UK (London) for the past couple of decades. Luciano has defined himself as a solo artist, not solely an instrumentalist, but a complete musician in line with the tradition set by the great maestri of the past. He has held the position of clarinet professor at the Leeds College of Music in the UK, he is a specialist of both classical and improvised music and his research focuses on extended techniques, unconventional sound production, sound effects and new compositions for solo clarinet. Music to him is part of a broader philosophical path (in the sense of "philo-sophia") where creativity is an important element of his life with an ontological relevance to him. When it comes to his art, "Luciano seems intent on challenging preconceptions" and his interpretations are praised as "bold and unique".  

Introduced as "the new voice of the clarinet" on the front page of De Klarinet magazine, a keen promoter of new music, he has been described by "Musician Magazine" as "a noted Italian clarinettist and composer who now makes his home in London, having developed an enviable reputation as an instrumental virtuoso around the UK and overseas via recordings and concert hall appearances". Praised by the International Clarinet Association for "the full range of his abilities", Luciano received a master's degree from the Conservatory of Music of Salerno (Italy) in 1999, has been awarded the Fellow status at the Higher Education Academy in the UK in 2010 and is now "one of Europe's leading exponents of jazz clarinet" according to the BBC Radio.

He began his career at the age of twelve performing at the Sala Curci of Naples and has since "established himself as the friendly face of contemporary clarinet" according to the Clarinet & Saxophone Magazine. He has held several recitals, master-classes, lecture-recitals and workshops in the UK, Europe and South America including the South Bank Centre in London, the Barber Institute of Fine Arts (Birmingham University), the Edinburgh Festival in Scotland, SESI Serie International and Centro Cultural São Paulo (Brazil), European Clarinet Festival in Belgium, The American Cathedral in Paris. In recent years he has been focusing primarily on his own music with premieres regularly held at St Martin in the Fields in London for their "New Music Series", Cambridge University and overseas. His compositions have been cited on books about the clarinet repertoire with credits that include some of the most established academic institutions of the UK, Brazil and Belgium.

Music style and Aesthetics 

As a composer, Luciano is not much interested in serialism (except for some very short passages of dodecaphonic technique here and there). His eclectic approach to music-making is inspired by the great musical figures of the past (who excelled as performers, improvisers, composers, conductors, educators, etc.) with a strong will to be a complete musician. Besides what he calls "performance pieces" (i.e. original material or arrangements he has written for his own performances) one can find several short compositions, highly condensed miniature pieces that range from more experimental and ground-breaking clarinet solo pieces informed by his research to more melodic music for clarinet and piano or other chamber ensembles (see his series of fragments or divertimenti). The influence of and his experience with popular music (including the folkloric music of his native land) can be noticed, above all jazz music, resulting in a style that alternates music full of energy (thanks to his harmonies and rhythms), sense of hunour and melancholy (see his sonatas for clarinet and piano). He has also written music for rarely used combinations of instruments, like clarinet and guitar quartet or music for clarinet, guitar and piano.

In terms of aesthetics, post-modernism is a good way to define most of his work. The "ironic re-elaboration" of the styles of the past (as Umberto Eco would put it) is evident in music that is often characterised by a peculiar sense of humour and often uses the form of the musical parody, most of all the "window form" (as the composer Salvatore Sciarrino would call it), where the artist "opens" a new door on a different "world" as clearly evident on his two of his major works, the Sequenza #1 and #2 (among the very few pieces that last more than ten minutes) and some of his compositions for clarinet and piano. For this reason one can find the use of music quotations from major composers or folkloric tunes, but also the creation of new folk tunes as intended by Bartok. The use of the "alea" ("aleatoric music") is quite frequent in Luciano's music for he aims at making the poetic gesture and the reproduction of the composition coincide making the piece unique every time it is performed. In his specific case, we find passages of "real-time" composing or variations of an "incipit" (a short idea), impromptu cadenzas and passages that leave to performers the choice of the line they have to play. This also explains the use of the basso continuo he makes on compositions for clarinet and piano (in this case a modern way to execute it combining notation and chord symbols if needed), mainly on his sonatas in one movement in fact inspired by the "sonata a solo" of the barocco era (for violin and b.c.).

In terms of harmonies, Luciano uses dissonant chords not connected to each other using the criteria of functional harmony. Instead, one finds chromatic chords, polytonality, clusters, passing notes ascending or descending chromatically and a peculiar use of quartal harmonies or mirror chords combined with edgy rhythms. In some cases, as in the Divertimento for Orchestra, we have a polyphony of independent lines with chromatic passages that create peculiar harmonies and dissonances. To him there is no need to emancipate dissonances, on the contrary, he wants dissonances and different shades of chromatic colours eventually releasing the tension on a more conventional chord (quite rarely using a more conventional cadence passage). Some music is wholly chromatic, like Sonata #5 for clarinet and basso continuo. 
It is really on the compositions for clarinet solo and clarinet ensemble where we find more experimental and ground-breaking material (e.g. "Mosquito", "Divertimento #9", "Divertimento #12"). Informed by his research on extended techniques, sound effects and unconventional sound production, we find lots of microtonal music where he draws in more pitches (quarter tones and microtones) to the chromatic scale generally using them as grace notes or embellishments. Often Luciano exploits a small cell made of a few notes (generally a section of the chromatic scale) that he then varies, modulating them or transposing them or using these sound effects (a good example of this is Fragments #6 and the "Fantasia for Demi-Clarinets"). On most pieces there is clearly a gravitational pull, that is a note that acts as an anchor around which the music gravitates (as evident in Fragment #4).

Selected works

Clarinet Solo:
 Fantasia for Demi-Clarinet (2015)
 Fragment #4 (2010)
 Fragment #5 (2010)
 Fragment #6 (2014)
 Homage to Puccini (2015)
 Rondò Contemporaneo (2010)
 Sequenza #1 "Il Prescelto" (2008)
 Sequenza #2 in A minor "The Resurrection" (2008)

Clarinet & Piano:
 Fragment #2 (Red Kite Music Limited, Bucks Music Group Ltd, 2005)
 Fragment #3 (2010)
 Homage to Poulenc #2 (2017)
 Sonata #2 "Stellare" per clarinetto e basso continuo (Red Kite Music Limited, Bucks Music Group Ltd, 2004)
 Sonata #3, in one movement (Red Kite Music Limited, Bucks Music Group Ltd, 2004)
 Sonata #5, per clarinetto e basso continuo (2008)
 Sonata #6 "Birth, life and death of Stravinsky", in one movement (2007)
 Sonata #8, in one movement (2018)

Clarinet ensembles or clarinet-led ensembles:
 DesafiNapoli. for Clarinet and Guitar Quartet (2012)
 Divertimento #3, "Londrina" for Clarinet Trio (Red Kite Music Limited, Bucks Music Group Ltd, 2004)
 Divertimento #4, for Clarinet Quartet or for solo clarinet with tape/pre-recorded parts(2009)
 Divertimento #5, "Concertando com Tau" for Clarinet and Guitar Quartet (2011)
 Divertimento #6 "Guido", for Clarinet and String Quartet (2008)
 Divertimento #7, "Canone, cadenza e finale from a theme of Prokofiev’s Lt. Kije'” for Clarinet Quartet (2008)
 Divertimento #9 "The Damnation of the Dreamer", for solo clarinet with tape/pre-recorded parts (2008)
 Divertimento #11 for Clarinet Trio or also available for Duo Clarinet and Bass Clarinet (2012)
 Divertimento #12 "La Redentrice del Sognatore", for solo clarinet with tape/pre-recorded parts (2015)
 "Mosquito", for Clarinet and Tape (pre-recorded clarinet, 2015)
 Variations on "Rasga o Meu Coraçao", Homenagem a Villa-Lobos, for clarinet and guitar quartet (2014)
 Vocalizzo, for clarinet and guitar (2015)

Other chamber ensemble
 Divertimento "Mediterraneo", for two guitars (2017)
 Fragment #9, for guitar and piano (2016)
 Two Miniatures for guitar and piano, from the album Poeta (2014)

for Orchestra
 Divertimento for Orchestra (2022)

Educational:
 Introductory Method to Extended Techniques for clarinet (2022)

Discography (as a solo artist)

 Passione M.A.P., Italy 2000
 Neapolis Red Kite Records, UK 2005
 Clarinet Partenope Productions/MCPS 2008 (digital reissue 2010)
 Partenope Partenope Productions/MCPS 2011
 Poeta Soundset Recording (USA)/MCPS UK 2016
 Fragments NovAntiqua Records, Italy 2018
 XX Century Music for Solo Clarinet NovAntiqua Records, Italy 2021

References

External links 
 Official Site

Italian clarinetists
Italian composers
Italian male composers
Living people
Academics of Leeds College of Music
1975 births
21st-century clarinetists
21st-century Italian male musicians